This is a list of notable persons of the Rowthers, a community from the peninsular states of Tamil Nadu and Kerala.

Historical personalities 

 Vavar Muslim saint

Economy 
Naureen Hassan, First Vice President of the Federal Reserve Bank of New York

Law and Judiciary 

 Fathima Beevi First woman judge of Supreme court of India 
Fakkir Mohamed Ibrahim Kalifulla former judge of the Supreme Court of India
B. Kemal Pasha retired judge of the High Court of Kerala 
S. M. Mohamed Idris Malaysian advocate

Politics 

 M. Muhammad Ismail Quaid-e-Millat freedom fighter and founder of IUML 
 Khalifulla Sahib politician and Dewan of Pudukkottai State in (1941-1947)
Karim Ghani politician in Southeast Asia of Indian origin. Before the Second World War Karim Ghani was a parliamentary secretary in Burma under Dr. Ba Maw 
K.T.M. Ahmed Ibrahim sahib Bahadur Indian politician
 K. S. G. Haja Shareef industrialist and politician
A. K. A. Abdul Samad Siraj-ul-Millat politician and leader of IUML
K. M. Kader Mohideen national president of IUML 
M.K.M. Abdul Salam politician and parliamentarian from Tiruchirappalli in 1957. 
 Nagore E. M. Hanifa singer and politician 
 Samsudeen politician 
M. Gulam Mohideen Politician, parliamentarian from Dindigal in 1957. 
S. M. Muhammed Sheriff was a politician and former parliamentarian from Tamil Nadu
E.S.M. Packeer Mohamed was a legislator (1980-84) and parliamentarian in 1989 from Mayiladuthurai 
A. Rahman Khan politician
J. M. Aaroon Rashid politician
T. P. M. Mohideen Khan is a former Minister for Environment in Tamil Nadu
S. S. Mohammad Ismail was a legislator from Aravakurichi in 1996 election
M. M. A. Razak Indian politician
A. Anwar Raja Indian politician
 Navaskani is a parliamentarian from Ramanathapuram

Science 

 M. A. Aleem Indian Neurologist

 P. K. Abdul Aziz Scientist in Ecology and Biodiversity
Dr Salim Yusuf Cardiologist, former World Heart Federation President, Rhodes scholar, Honour of Canada recipient

Literature 

 Umaru Pulavar (1642-1703) Tamil poet

 Kunangudi Mastan Sahib (1792-1838) Tamil Qadiriyya Sufi poet.
 Gulam Kadir Navalar 19th century Tamil poet
 P. Dawood Shah Tamil poet in Madurai Tamil Sangam, freedom fighter and he started Darul Islam magazine in 1919
Ka. Mu. Sheriff Tamil writer and poet
Mu. Metha Tamil poet and song writer
Nooranad Haneef Malayalam author
Syed Thajudeen Malaysian painter 
Rajathi Salma Tamil writer & Activist
Manushyaputhiran Tamil poet and writer

Cinema 

 Prem Nazir Indian Film Actor known as one of Malayalam cinema's definitive leading men of his generation
 M. K. Mustafa Indian Actor
 Editor Mohan film editor and producer 
 Ibrahim Rowther Tamil Famous Film Producer
Liaquat Ali Khan Indian Director and Screenwriter
 Fazil Indian Film Director
 Fahadh Faasil Indian Actor and Film Producer
 Mansoor Ali Khan Indian Actor and politician 
 Mohan Raja Indian Film Director 
 Jayam Ravi Indian Actor 
 Ameer Sultan Actor, Film Director, Film Producer and Screenwriter 
 Anwar Rasheed Film director and producer
 Farook Abdul Rahman Indian Filmmaker and Writer
 Prem Nawas Indian film Actor
 Shanawas Indian Actor
 Rafi Screenwriter and Director
 Shafi Indian film Director
 Siddique Film Director 
 Abdul Kalam Azad Indian photographer 
 Rahman Indian Actor
 Hakkim Rawther Indian Actor and Filmmaker in Mollywood
 Shaam Indian Actor
 Asif Ali Indian Actor and Film Producer
 Afsal Indian film singer 
 Ajmal Ameer Indian actor and former physician
 Askar Ali Indian Actor
 Kottayam Nazeer Indian Actor and Impressionist
 Chitti Babu Indian Actor 
 Bobby Kottarakkara Indian Actor 
 Farhan Faasil Indian Actor
 V. Z. Durai Indian Film Director 
 Raja Mohammad Indian film editor 
 Hesham Abdul Wahab Indian music composer 
 Irfan Indian Actor
 Pattanam Rasheed Indian make-up Artist

See also 

 Tamil Muslim

Reference 

Muslim communities lists